Hana Matelová  (born 8 June 1990 in Zlín) is a Czech table tennis player. She competed at the 2016 Summer Olympics in the women's singles event, in which she was eliminated in the first round by Zhang Mo. She won the French Championship with ASRTT Etival Clairefontaine on 2018–2019 season.

References

1990 births
Czech female table tennis players
Sportspeople from Zlín
Olympic table tennis players of the Czech Republic
Table tennis players at the 2016 Summer Olympics
Living people
Table tennis players at the 2015 European Games
European Games medalists in table tennis
European Games bronze medalists for the Czech Republic
Table tennis players at the 2019 European Games
Table tennis players at the 2020 Summer Olympics